Iotacism (iotakismos) or itacism is the process of vowel shift by which a number of vowels and diphthongs converged towards the pronunciation  in post-classical Greek and Modern Greek. The alternative term itacism refers to the new pronunciation of the name of the letter eta as  after the change.

Vowels and diphthongs involved

Ancient Greek had a broader range of vowels (see Ancient Greek phonology) than Modern Greek has. Eta was a long open-mid front unrounded vowel , and upsilon was a close front rounded vowel . Over the course of time, both vowels came to be pronounced like the close front unrounded vowel iota . In addition, certain diphthongs merged to the same pronunciation. Specifically, Epsilon-iota initially became  in Classical Greek before it later raised to  while, later, omicron-iota and upsilon-iota merged with upsilon. As a result of eta and upsilon being affected by iotacism, so were the respective diphthongs.

In Modern Greek, the letters and digraphs  (rare) are all pronounced .

Issues in textual criticism
Iotacism caused some words with originally distinct pronunciations to be pronounced similarly, sometimes the cause of differences between manuscript readings in the New Testament. For example, the upsilon of  hymeis, hymōn "ye, your" (second person plural in respectively nominative, genitive) and the eta of  hēmeis, hēmōn "we, our" (first person plural in respectively nominative, genitive) could be easily confused if a lector were reading to copyists in a scriptorium. (In fact, Modern Greek had to develop a new second-person plural, εσείς, while the first-person plural's eta was opened to epsilon, εμείς, as a result of apparent attempts to prevent it sounding like the old second-person plural.) As an example of a relatively minor (almost insignificant) source of variant readings, some ancient manuscripts spelled words the way they sounded, such as the 4th-century Codex Sinaiticus, which sometimes substitutes a plain iota for the epsilon-iota digraph and sometimes does the reverse.

English-speaking textual critics use the word "itacism" to refer to the phenomenon and extend it loosely for all inconsistencies of spelling involving vowels.

See also
Greek language
Greek alphabet
Ancient Greek phonology
Koine Greek phonology
Medieval Greek 
Modern Greek phonology
Vowel shift 
 Minuscule 541 and Minuscule 543 – manuscripts with an unusual number of itacistic errors

References

Greek language
Koine Greek
Vowel shifts